False Dmitry I (or Pseudo-Demetrius I) reigned as the Tsar of Russia from 10 June 1605 until his death on 17 May 1606 under the name of Dmitriy Ivanovich. According to historian Chester S.L. Dunning, Dmitry was "the only Tsar ever raised to the throne by means of a military campaign and popular uprisings".

He was the first, and most successful, of three "pretenders" who claimed during the Time of Troubles to be the youngest son of Ivan the Terrible, tsarevich Dmitry Ivanovich, who supposedly escaped a 1591 assassination attempt when he was eight years old. It is generally believed that the real Dmitry of Uglich died in Uglich in 1591. False Dmitry claimed that his mother, Maria Nagaya, anticipated the assassination attempt ordered by Boris Godunov and helped him escape to a monastery in the Tsardom of Russia, and the assassins killed somebody else instead. He said he fled to the Polish–Lithuanian Commonwealth after he came to the attention of Boris Godunov, who ordered him seized. Many Polish nobles did not believe his story, but nonetheless supported him.

With the support of the Polish–Lithuanian Commonwealth, False Dmitry invaded the Russian Empire in 1605, but the war ended with the sudden death of Boris Godunov. Disaffected Russian boyars staged a coup against the new tsar, Feodor II. False Dmitry entered Moscow on 21 July 1605, and was crowned tsar. Maria Nagaya accepted him as her son and "confirmed" his story. False Dmitry's reign was marked by his openness to Catholicism and allowing foreigners into Russia. This made him unpopular with the boyars, who staged a successful coup and killed him eleven months after he took the throne. His wife of 10 days, Marina, would later "accept" False Dmitry II as her fallen husband.

Background
Dmitry entered history circa 1600, after making a positive impression on Patriarch Job of Moscow with his learning and assurance. Tsar Boris Godunov ordered the young man seized and questioned. Dmitry fled to Prince Constantine Ostrogski at Ostroh, in the Polish–Lithuanian Commonwealth, and subsequently entered the service of the Wiśniowieckis, a polonized Ruthenian family. The princes Adam and Michał Wiśniowiecki in particular showed interest in the stories Dmitry told, and who he purported to be, as they gave the Poles an opportunity to capitalize on the political rancor in Moscow.

Rumors said that Dmitry was an illegitimate son of the Polish king, Stefan Batory, who reigned from 1575 to 1586. According to a later tale, Dmitry blurted out that identity once, when a violent master slapped him. Dmitry's own story was that his mother, Tsar Ivan's widow, anticipated Boris Godunov's assassination attempt, and put him into the care of a doctor, who hid him in various monasteries through the years. After the doctor died, Dmitry fled to Poland, and worked briefly there as a teacher before he entered the service of the Wiśniowieckis. Some who had known Ivan IV later claimed that Dmitry did indeed resemble the young tsarevich. The young man also possessed such aristocratic skills  as horsemanship and literacy, and was fluent in Russian, Polish, and French.

Whether or not Dmitry's tale was accurate, the Wiśniowiecki brothers, Samuel Tyszkiewicz, Jan Sapieha, and several other Polish noblemen agreed to back him, and his claim, against Boris Godunov.

In March 1604, Dmitry visited the court of Sigismund III Vasa in Kraków. The king provisionally supported him, but did not promise any military help. To attract the powerful Jesuits to his cause, Dmitry publicly converted to Roman Catholicism on 17 April 1604, and convinced papal nuncio Claudio Rangoni to also back his claim.

While at court, Dmitry met Marina Mniszech, daughter of Polish nobleman Jerzy Mniszech. Dmitry and Marina fell in love. When he asked her father for her hand, he was promised it in return for granting the Mniszechs full rights to the Russian towns of Pskov, Novgorod, Smolensk, and Novhorod-Siverskyi upon his ascension.

Russian throne

Boris Godunov received word of Dmitry's Polish support, and spread claims than the younger man was simply a runaway monk called Grigory Otrepyev (born Yuri Otrepyev; Grigory was the name given to him at the monastery). On what information this claim was based is uncertain. But the tsar's public support began to wane, especially as Dmitry's loyalists spread counter-rumors. Several Russian boyars also pledged themselves to Dmitry, thereby giving themselves a "legitimate" reason to not pay taxes to Tsar Boris.

Dmitry, having gained the full support of the Polish Commonwealth, formed a small army of approximately 3,500 soldiers from various private Polish and Lithuanian forces. With his men he advanced on Russia in March 1605. Boris's many enemies, including the southern Cossacks, joined Dmitry's army on the long march to Moscow. These combined forces fought two engagements with reluctant Russian soldiers. Winning the first, they captured Chernigov (modern Chernihiv), Putivl (Putyvl), Sevsk, and Kursk, but they badly lost the second battle. Their cause was only saved by the news of the sudden death of Boris Godunov on 13 April 1605.

The death of the unpopular tsar swept away the last impediment to Dmitry; the victorious Russian troops defected to his side, and others, swelled the Polish ranks as they marched in. On 1 June, the disaffected boyars of Moscow staged a palace coup and imprisoned the newly crowned tsar Feodor II and his mother Maria Skuratova-Belskaya, widow of Boris Godunov.

On 20 June, Dmitry made his triumphal entry into Moscow, and on 21 July, was crowned tsar by a new Muscovite Patriarch of his own choosing, the Greek Ignatius of Moscow.

Reign

The new tsar moved to consolidate his power by visiting the tomb of Tsar Ivan, and the convent of his widow Maria Nagaya, who accepted him as her son and "confirmed" his story. The Godunovs were killed, including Tsar Feodor and his mother, with the exception of Tsarevna Xenia, whom Dmitry raped and kept as a concubine for five months. Many of the noble families Tsar Boris had exiled – such as the Shuiskys, Golitsins and Romanovs – were pardoned and allowed to return to Moscow. Feodor Romanov, sire of the future imperial dynasty, was soon appointed as metropolitan of Rostov; the old patriarch Job, who did not recognize the new tsar, was sent into exile.

Dmitry planned to introduce a series of political and economic reforms. He restored Yuri's Day, the day when serfs were allowed to change their allegiance to another lord, easing the conditions of peasantry. His favorite at the Russian court, 18-year-old Prince Ivan Khvorostinin, is considered by historians to be one of Russia's first Westernizers.

In foreign policy, Dmitry sought an alliance with his sponsor, the Polish Commonwealth, and with the Papal States. He planned for war against the Ottoman Empire, ordering mass production of firearms to prepare for the conflict. In his correspondence, he referred to himself as "Emperor of Russia" a century before Tsar Peter I used the title, although this was not recognized at the time. Dmitry's royal depictions featured him clean-shaven, with slicked-back dark hair, an unusual look for the era.

On 8 May 1606, Dmitry married Marina Mniszech in Moscow; she was Catholic. When a Russian Tsar married a woman of another faith, the usual practice was that she would convert to Eastern Orthodox Christianity. Rumors circulated that Dmitry had obtained the support of Polish King Sigismund and Pope Paul V by promising to reunite the Russian Orthodox Church and the Holy See; so, claimed the rumors, Tsarina Marina did not convert to the Orthodox faith. This angered the Russian Orthodox Church, the boyars, and the population alike.

The resentful Prince Vasily Shuisky, head of the boyars, began to plot against the tsar, accusing him of spreading Roman Catholicism, Lutheranism, and sodomy. This gained traction and popular support, especially since Dmitry surrounded himself with foreigners who flouted Russian customs. According to Russian chronicler Avraamy Palitsyn, Dmitry further enraged many Muscovites by permitting his Catholic and Protestant soldiers, whom the Russian Church regarded as heretics, to pray in Orthodox churches.

Shuisky's adherents had spread word that Tsar Dmitry was about to order his Polish retainers to lock the city gates and massacre the people of Moscow. Whether such orders existed or not, Palitsyn's chronicle reported them as undeniable fact.

Death
On the morning of 17 May 1606, ten days after Dmitry's marriage to Marina, huge numbers of boyars and commoners stormed the Kremlin. Dmitry tried to flee by jumping out a window, but fractured his leg in the fall. He fled to a bathhouse and tried to disappear within. But he was recognized and dragged out by the boyars, who killed him lest he successfully appeal to the crowd. His body was hacked to pieces, burned, and then the ashes fired from a cannon towards Poland.  According to Palitsyn, Dmitry's death set off a massacre of his supporters. He boasted in his chronicle that "a great amount of heretical blood was spilled on the streets of Moscow."

Dmitry's reign had lasted only eleven months before Prince Shuisky took his place. Two further impostors later appeared, False Dmitry II and False Dmitry III, the first of whom was publicly "accepted" by Tsarina Marina as her fallen husband.

Portrayals in literature
False Dmitry is one of the primary characters in Alexander Pushkin's blank verse drama Boris Godunov. Pushkin's character is a young novice monk who impersonates the Tsarevich after he learns he is the age the child would have been had he lived. Pushkin's decision to humanise the False Dmitry earned him the disapproval of Emperor Nicholas I of Russia, who prevented the play from being published or staged. In an unpublished foreword, Pushkin wrote, "There is much of Henri IV in Dmitri. Like him he is brave, generous and boastful, like him indifferent to religion -- both abjure their faith for a political cause, both love pleasures and war, both devote themselves to chimerical projects, both are victims of conspiracies... But Henri IV didn't have a Ksenya [Xenia] on his conscience -- it is true that this horrible accusation hasn't been proved and, as for me, I make a point of not believing it." Pushkin intended to write further plays about the reigns of Dmitry and Vasili, as well as the subsequent Time of Troubles. Pushkin was prevented from fulfilling these plans by his death in a duel at the age of 37.
Although based on Pushkin's play, Modest Mussorgsky's opera of the same name demonizes False Dmitry, the Polish people, and the Roman Catholic Church. False Dmitry's engagement to Marina Mniszech is portrayed as instigated by a Jesuit. Marina balks at seducing the pretender, and the Jesuit threatens her with hellfire until she grovels at his feet. In contrast, Pushkin's believed that Marina was motivated by pathological ambition. At the opera's denouement, the pretender's ascent to the throne is lamented by the holy fool Nikolai, who appears in Pushkin's play only to rebuke Tsar Boris for murdering the real Dmitry. In Mussorgsky's opera, the holy fool proclaims, "Weep, weep Orthodox soul", and predicts that "the enemy will come" leading to "darkness blacker than night." 
False Dmitry's story was also told by Schiller (in Demetrius), Sumarokov, Khomyakov, by Victorin Joncières in his opera Dimitri, and by Antonín Dvořák in his opera Dimitrij. 
Rainer Maria Rilke recounts the overthrow of False Dimitry in The Notebooks of Malte Laurids Brigge, Rilke's only longer prose work.
Harold Lamb fictionalizes the demise of False Dimitry in "The Wolf Master", in which the claimant survives his assassination through trickery, and flees east, pursued by a Cossack he had betrayed.
Features in the second story of The Ninth Doctor Adventures: Back to Earth (Volume 2.1), a boxset of Doctor Who audio dramas from Big Finish Productions.

See also

 Bibliography of Russian history (1223–1613)
Ivan Bolotnikov
Isaac Massa
Polish–Muscovite War (1605–18)
Tsars of Russia family tree

References

External links
 
 The Reporte of a bloudie and terrible Massacre in the Citty of Mosco, with the fearefull and tragicall end of Demetrius the last Duke, before him raigning at this present. (1607) London.

1582 births
1606 deaths
17th-century Russian monarchs
Deaths by firearm in Russia
False Dmitrys
Impostors
Leaders ousted by a coup
Leaders who took power by coup
Murdered Russian monarchs
Roman Catholic monarchs
Russian Roman Catholics
Russian tsars
Russian rapists
17th-century murdered monarchs
Murder in 1606